The German-speaking electoral college is one of three constituencies of the European Parliament in Belgium. It elects one MEP and is the only constituency to make use of first past the post.

This is the European Parliament's smallest constituency, with an electorate at the 2004 election of just 46,914.

Boundaries 
The constituency corresponds to the German-speaking Community of Belgium.

Member of the European Parliament

Election results

2019

2014

2009

2004

1999

1994

References

External links 
 2019 European election results

European Parliament constituencies in Belgium
German-speaking Community of Belgium
Electoral colleges
1994 establishments in Belgium
Constituencies established in 1994